The 1985–86 League of Ireland First Division season was the first season of the League of Ireland First Division. The inaugural First Division featured ten teams. Bray Wanderers won the title.

Overview
In 1985 five teams – Bray Wanderers, Cobh Ramblers, Derry City, E.M.F.A.  and Newcastle United – were elected to join the League of Ireland. All five subsequently participated in the inaugural 1985–86 First Division season, along with Monaghan United from the League of Ireland B Division and four clubs – Drogheda United, Finn Harps, Longford Town and Sligo Rovers – who were relegated following the 1984–85 League of Ireland season. Bray Wanderers were the inaugural First Division champions.

Final table

See also
 1985–86 League of Ireland Premier Division

References

League of Ireland First Division seasons
2
Ireland